= Catalan nouns =

Catalan (and Valencian) nouns are inflected for gender (masculine or feminine), and number (singular or plural). There is no case inflection. Articles and adjectives agree in gender and number with the noun they refer to.

Usually, masculine nouns are unmarked, feminine nouns carry the suffix -a; and the plural is marked with the suffix -s, which makes the feminine ending turn into -e-. Thus, the most common declension paradigm for Catalan names is the one that follows:

Example: declension of gat "cat"
| | masculine | feminine |
|---|---|---|
| singular | gat | gata |
| plural | gats | gates |

== Gender inflection ==
The grammatical gender of a Catalan noun does not necessarily correspond with the real-life object's biological sex (or lack thereof). Nouns denoting a person, such as home "man" or dona "woman", generally agree with the natural gender of what is described. However, Catalan assigns gender to nouns without natural gender in arbitrary fashion. For example, the word tamboret ("stool") is masculine, while the word cadira ("chair") is feminine.

=== Living beings with distinct masculine and feminine forms ===
Living beings of the same species usually are designed by two nouns: one of masculine grammatical gender for biologically male individuals, and one of feminine grammatical gender for biologically female individuals. Both names, masculine and feminine, are usually only differentiated by their ending; sometimes the second is derived from the first or vice versa. Rarely, both come from different roots.

==== Formation of the feminine form from the masculine ====
- Most times the feminine form is created by appending the suffix -a to the unmarked masculine form.

Noi → noia. Avi → àvia.
"Boy – girl." "Grandfather – grandmother."

- If the masculine form ends in -t, -p, -f, -s, the addition of the feminine suffix -a may cause these consonants to become voiced to -d-, -b-, -v-, -s-; or not. There are no rules to deduce the change.

| | becomes voiced | | | remains unvoiced | | |
| change | masculine | feminine | gloss | masculine | feminine | gloss |
|---|---|---|---|---|---|---|
| ⟨-t⟩ → ⟨-d-⟩ /t/ → /ð/ | nebot | neboda | "nephew – niece" | nét | neta | "grandson – granddaughter" |
| ⟨-p⟩ → ⟨-b-⟩ /p/ → /β/ | llop | lloba | "wolf" | | | |
| ⟨-f⟩ → ⟨-v-⟩ /f/ → /v~β/ | serf | serva | "serf" | | | |
| ⟨-s⟩ → ⟨-s-⟩ /s/ → /z/ | espòs | esposa | "husband – wife" | gos | gossa | "dog – bitch" |

- If the masculine form ends in a stressed vowel, the feminine is created by appending the suffix -na.

Germà → germana
"Brother – sister."

- Sometimes the feminine form is created by appending the suffix -essa to the unmarked masculine form.

Sacerdot → sacerdotessa.
"Priest – priestess."

==== Formation of the masculine form from the feminine ====
- Sometimes the masculine form is created from the feminine by changing the suffix a for -ot.

Bruixot ← bruixa.
"Wizard – witch."

=== Living beings with indistinct masculine and feminine forms ===
- Sometimes a single noun is used to designate both masculine and feminine beings. To specify the biological gender of the being, the adjectives mascle "male", and femella "female" are used.

El rossinyol. El rossinyol mascle. El rossinyol femella.
" The nightingale." "The male nightingale." "The female nightingale"

=== Objects, abstract concepts ===
- Since objects and abstract concepts have no biological gender, all of them only have one form. The gender of inanimate nouns is assigned arbitrarily. Sometimes the choice may seem contradictory.

La virilitat (f).
"The manliness."

- Sometimes synonymous words may have different genders.

El televisor (m) – la televisió (f). L'argent (m) – la plata (f)
"The TV." "The silver."

=== Homophonous words with different genders ===
- Some homonymous words may have different genders according to their meaning.

El clau (m) – la clau (f)
"The nail – the key."

== Number inflection ==
Like all the Western Romance languages, the formation of the plural involves the addition of the suffix -s to the singular. However, the stem may undergo some changes. The number inflection of adjectives follows the same rules.

- Most times the plural form is created by appending the suffix -s to the singular form.

Pare → pares. Avi → avis.
"Father – fathers." "Grandfather – grandfathers."

- If the singular ends in -a, the plural is usually formed with -es. Most of these nouns are feminine, but some are masculine.

Casa → cases (f). Problema → problemes (m).
"House – houses." "Problem – problems"

  - However, if the singular ends in -ga, -ca, -gua, -qua, -ça, -ja, the plural is formed by -gues, -ques, -gües, -qües, -ces, -ges. This is made for orthographical reasons, and stem pronunciation remains identical in the singular and plural.

| sound | transformation | singular (stem underlined) | plural (stem underlined) | IPA transcription | gloss |
|---|---|---|---|---|---|
| /ɣ/ | ⟨g⟩ → ⟨gu⟩ | farga | fargues | /ˈfarɣə(s)/ | "forge(s)" |
| /k/ | ⟨c⟩ → ⟨qu⟩ | oca | oques | /ˈɔkə(s)/ | "goose – geese" |
| /ɣw/ | ⟨gu⟩ → ⟨gü⟩ | llengua | llengües | /ˈʎeŋɡwə(s)/ | "tongue(s)" |
| /kw/ | ⟨qu⟩ → ⟨qü⟩ | pasqua | pasqües | /ˈpaskwə(s)/ | "Easter(s)" |
| /s/ | ⟨ç⟩ → ⟨c⟩ | plaça | places | /ˈpɫasə(s)/ | "square(s)" |
| /ʒ/ | ⟨j⟩ → ⟨g⟩ | pluja | pluges | /ˈpɫuʒə(s)/ | "rain(s)" |
| /ddʒ/ | ⟨j⟩ → ⟨g⟩ | platja | platges | /ˈpɫaddʒə(s)/ | "beach(es)" |

- If the singular form ends in a stressed vowel, the plural is usually created by appending the suffix -ns.

Pa → pans (m). Capità → capitans (m). Acció → accions (f).
"Bread – breads." "Captain – captains." "Action – actions."

  - However, some words ending in a stressed vowel form their plural in -s. Many of them are relatively recent loanwords not directly inherited from late Latin.

Sofà → sofàs. Bambú → bambús.
"Sofa – sofas." "Bamboo – bamboos."

  - A few nouns ending in unstressed -e can also form their plural alternatively in -ns. It is considered archaic or dialectal.

Home → homes or hòmens. Orfe → orfes or òrfens
"Man – men." "Orphan – orphans."

- Many masculine nouns ending in -s, ç form their plural with -os. -s- becomes voiced in the plural, but -ç- remains unvoiced.

Gas → gasos /ˈgas – ˈgazus/. Braç → braços /ˈbɾas – ˈbɾasus/.
"Gas – gases." "Arm – arms."

  - In some masculine nouns ending in -s, this remains unvoiced when adding -os, and thus becomes -ss-:

  - Most polysyllabic masculine words ending in -às, -ís, ús.

Fracàs → fracassos. Pastís → pastissos. Barnús → barnussos
"Failure – failures." "Cake – cakes." "Bathrobe – bathrobes"

  - Most masculine words ending in -os, -ós, òs.

Gos → gossos. Arròs → arrossos. Ós → óssos.
"Dog – dogs." "Rice – rices." "Bear – bears."

- Masculine paroxytone and proparoxytone nouns ending in -s are invariable.

Llapis → llapis. Òmnibus – òmnibus
"Pencil – pencils." "Omnibus – omnibuses."

- Feminine nouns ending in an s-like sound (-s, -ç, -x, -z) have a plural that is pronounced the same as the singular. If the noun ends in -s, no ending is added. Otherwise, an unpronounced -s is added.

Pols → pols. Calç → calçs /ˈkaɫs/.
"Dust – dusts." "Lime – limes."

- Nouns ending in -x pronounced /ks/ form plurals according to word stress. If the noun is stressed on the last syllable, the plural suffix is -os. Otherwise, the ending is -s and the plural form is homophonous with the singular.

Reflex → reflexos /rəˈflɛksus/. Índex → índexs /ˈindəks/.
"Reflection – reflections." "Index – indexes."

- Nouns ending in -x pronounced /ʃ/ form their plural with -os.

Calaix → calaixos.
"Drawer – drawers."

- Nouns ending in -ig (/tʃ/) can form their plural in two ways, both acceptable:
  - Adding -s. Both forms will be homophonous. This is the preferred form.

Faig → faigs /ˈfatʃ/. Passeig → Passeigs /pəˈsɛtʃ/.

  - Replacing -ig with jos or tjos. There are no rules to deduce which is to be used.

Faig → fajos /ˈfatʃ – ˈfaʒus/. Passeig → Passetjos. /pəˈsɛtʃ – pəˈsɛddʒus/.
"Beech – beeches." "Promenade – promenades."

- Nouns ending in -sc, -st, -xt can form their plural in two ways, both acceptable: Adding -s (preferred), or adding -os.

Bosc → boscs or boscos. Gust → gusts or gustos. Pretext → pretexts or pretextos
"Forest – forests." "Taste – tastes." "Pretext – pretexts."

- Feminine nouns ending in -st always form the plural by adding -s.

Host → hosts.
"Hueste – huestes."

== Books ==
- Fabra, Pompeu (1933) [1918]. Gramàtica Catalana (PDF) (in Catalan) (7th ed.). Barcelona: Institut d'Estudis Catalans. ISBN 84-7283-290-2. [Facsimile published in 1995]
